Adolfo Borinaga Alix Jr., also known as Adolf Alix Jr. (born October 17, 1978), is a Filipino screenwriter and film director.

Biography
He was born October 17, 1978, in Makati, Philippines.

He graduated magna cum laude at the Pamantasan ng Lungsod ng Maynila (University of the City of Manila) with a degree in Mass Communications.

He started as a scriptwriter for films and television. His screenplays include Carlos Siguion-Reyna's Kahapon May Dalawang Bata (1999), Gil Portes' Mga Munting Tinig (2002) and Homecoming (2003), Joyce Bernal's D' Anothers (2005), among others.

He also handled film and screenwriting classes at his alma mater, San Beda College-Alabang and at De La Salle University-Taft.

His first film, Donsol was a finalist in the 2006 Cinemalaya Independent Film Festival where it won Best Actress and Best Cinematography honors. The film was screened in several international film festivals abroad and garnered Special Jury prizes in the Asian Marine Film Festival in Japan and in the Fort Lauderdale International Film Festival in the U.S.A. It was also the Philippines' official submission to the Academy Awards® (OSCARS) Best Foreign Language Film category.

Since his debut as a director, he has become one of the promising young Filipino filmmakers with his other films screened at various international film festivals.

Kadin (2006), Alix's second feature, premiered in the Ici et ailleurs section of the 60th Locarno International Film Festival in Switzerland and competed in the 27th Festival International du Film d' Amiens in France. His third film, Tambolista (2007) was featured in the Sturm und Drang (Cinema of the Future) section of the 37th Rotterdam International Film Festival. Adela (2008), his feature starring veteran actress Anita Linda, was screened at Toronto, Pusan and Rotterdam International Film Festivals and was part of the Contempor Asian series of the Museum of Modern Art in New York. It also won in all the categories of the Young Critics' Circle Awards 2009 including Best Picture and Best Performer.

Manila (2009), starring and produced by Piolo Pascual and co-directed with Raya Martin, was selected in the Out-of-Competition (Special Screenings) section of the 62nd Festival de Cannes.

Aurora (2009), about a social worker kidnapped in the Southern Philippines, received post-production support from the Hubert Bals Fund of the International Film Festival Rotterdam. Chassis (2010), dealing with the lives of people illegally living under the chassis of container vans, competed in Mar 25 del Plata International Film Festival after its screenings in Pusan, Rotterdam, Goteborg, Warsaw and Vancouver.

Isda (Fable of the Fish) (2011) starring Cherry Pie Picache and Bembol Roco, premiered in the Visions section of the Toronto International Film Festival and was screened in Busan, Kerala, Dubai, Nantes and Goteborg. Haruo (2011), about the travails of an ex-Yakuza living in the Philippines, was awarded by the Young Critics' Circle as their Best Film of 2011.

His twentieth feature Kalayaan (Wildlife) (2012), which received script development support from the Hubert Bals Fund of the International Film Festival Rotterdam and an honorable mention from the Global Film Initiative, starred Thai superstar Ananda Everingham premiered in the Busan International Film Festival and won Best Asian Film in the Warsaw International Film Festival among others.

Mater Dolorosa, a Cinema One Originals 2012 entry and headlined by Gina Alajar, about a matriarch trying to put her family together against the backdrop of local illegal activities won Best Director honors at the Gawad Urian and competed in the Rotterdam International Film Festival and the Deauville Asian Film Festival in France.

Death March (2013), based on real events about the difficulties of the Filipino and American soldiers after the fall of Bataan, competed in the Un Certain Regard section of the prestigious Festival de Cannes 2013.

Porno (2013), a triptych of stories about people linked by pornography, which premiered in the Directors Showcase category of the 2013 Cinemalaya Independent Film Festival. The project was part of the Hong Kong-Asia Film Financing Forum in 2009. The film was voted Best Film by the Young Critics Circle for 2013 winning four other awards including Best Performer. It also won the Gawad Urian (National Critics Awards) for Best Production Design.

In television, he started as a director for ABS-CBN's daytime series Hiyas based on Precious Hearts romance books.

Then, he directed GMA News TV's first original series Bayan Ko (Catholic Mass Media awardee for Best Drama Series and Best Inspirational Drama in the Asian Rainbow TV Awards 2014) which dealt with the exploits of a young town mayor trying to change the system and Sa Puso ni Dok for GMA Network, a miniseries about the plight of doctors to the barrios (Certificate of Honor – Best Miniseries from the U.S. T.V. and Video International Film Festival)

He is currently one of the regular directors of Wagas, a weekly anthology of true-to-life love stories, (which garnered Gold honors in the U.S. T.V. and Video International Film Festival 2014) the afternoon drama anthology Karelasyon and the weekly comedy series Conan, My Beautician.

He has also served as a member of the international jury of the Busan International Film Festival in 2013 and the Shanghai International Film Festival in 2014.

Alix has been listed by The Hollywood Reporter in its "Next Generation Asia 2010", which features the top 20 young entertainment personalities in the region deemed "the best and the brightest among their peers" from a vast region considered "the world"s biggest entertainment market."

Filmography

Awards and citations

References

External links

Philippine Center for Creative Imaging

1978 births
Living people
People from Makati
Artists from Metro Manila
Filipino screenwriters
Filipino film directors
Filipino television directors
Pamantasan ng Lungsod ng Maynila alumni
GMA Network (company) people
ABS-CBN people